The 1944 Bolu–Gerede earthquake occurred at 05:22 local time on 1 February. The earthquake had an estimated magnitude of 7.5  and a maximum felt intensity of IX–X (Violent–Extreme) on the Mercalli intensity scale. It ruptured part of the North Anatolian Fault, forming part of a progressive sequence of events that generally migrated westwards along the fault zone, starting with the 1939 Erzincan earthquake.

See also
 List of earthquakes in 1944
 List of earthquakes in Turkey

References

External links

1944 Bolu
1944 earthquakes
1944 in Turkey
History of Bolu Province
February 1944 events
1944 disasters in Turkey